Fiałkowo  is a village in the administrative district of Gmina Dopiewo, within Poznań County, Greater Poland Voivodeship, in west-central Poland.

The village has a population of 42.

References

Villages in Poznań County